Randall Atcheson is an American concert pianist.

Life and career
Randall Atcheson, the son of a Southern Baptist minister, was raised in Maplesville, Alabama and Clanton, Alabama. He began studying piano at the age of six and added the organ at the age of nine. By the time he was 12 years old, he was enrolled in the Samford University School of Music in Birmingham, Alabama. In 1971, Atcheson transferred to New York city's Juilliard School where he went on to become the first student allowed to pursue and receive simultaneous degrees in piano and organ performance. He made his New York public performance debut at the Juilliard's Alice Tully Hall playing both instruments.

In the course of his career, Atcheson has performed at major venues internationally, including the Notre Dame Cathedral, Salle Gaveau and the American Embassy in Paris, France, Blenheim Palace in England, as well as 10 performances at Carnegie Hall.

Atcheson was named a Steinway Artist in 1991.

Discography

References 

1951 births
Living people
Musicians from Selma, Alabama
American classical pianists
Male classical pianists
American male pianists
People from Chilton County, Alabama
20th-century American pianists
21st-century classical pianists
20th-century American male musicians
21st-century American male musicians
21st-century American pianists